Telecom Plus plc is a British multi-utility supplier of gas, electricity, home insurance, and landline, broadband and mobile services to residences and businesses. It is listed on the London Stock Exchange and is a constituent of the FTSE 250 Index.

History
The company was founded in 1996 as a telecommunications business. Its first product, launched in 1997, was a least cost call routing 'Smart Box', a gadget that plugs into a phone socket and routes the calls to alternative networks at a cheaper rate than British Telecom.

In 2017 the company sold its 20% stake in Opus Energy to Drax Group.

In October 2022, the company had over 800,000 customers.

Operations
The company has two subsidiaries:
 Utility Warehouse operates a landline telephony service, mobile telephony (as an MVNO on the EE network), and supplies broadband, gas and electricity. It also offers home insurance and a pre-paid VISA card (a "cashback" card).
 Telecommunications Management Limited provides a landline telephony service to small and medium-sized enterprise (SME) customers, as well as operating the 1pMobile consumer MVNO.

The company uses a multi-level marketing model to recruit customers and distributors.

References

External links

Telecommunications companies of the United Kingdom
Companies based in the London Borough of Barnet
Telecommunications companies established in 1996
Electric power companies of the United Kingdom
Utilities of the United Kingdom
Multi-level marketing companies
Companies listed on the London Stock Exchange